Michael Hoffman (born November 24, 1989) is a Canadian professional ice hockey forward currently playing for the Montreal Canadiens of the National Hockey League (NHL). Hoffman has previously played for the Ottawa Senators, Florida Panthers and St. Louis Blues. The Senators drafted Hoffman 130th overall in the 2009 NHL Entry Draft.

Playing career

Junior
Hoffman started his junior hockey career with the Kitchener Dutchmen of the Mid-Western Junior Hockey League in 2006–07. earning a rookie of the year nomination. At the end of the 2006–07 season, the Kitchener Rangers of the Ontario Hockey League (OHL) called him up for two games in the season, and four in the playoffs. At the start of the 2007–08 season, he failed to make the Rangers. Since no OHL team picked him up, he transferred to the Quebec Major Junior Hockey League (QMJHL), where he played until 2010.

Hoffman first joined the Gatineau Olympiques of the QMJHL but was released after 19 games. In 2010, Olympiques General Manager Charlie Henry said that Hoffman was "a good player for us, but he didn't work as hard as he works today." The last-place Drummondville Voltigeurs eventually picked him up and he finished the season with 24 goals in 62 games. He was not selected in the 2008 NHL Entry Draft, his first year of eligibility. However, he attended the Philadelphia Flyers' training camp on an amateur tryout and was released on September 29.

Hoffman then returned to Drummondville. In the 2008–09 season, he achieved prominence by scoring 52 goals in 62 games with the Voltigeurs, who came from last in the 2007–08 season to win the 2009 QMJHL championship title and a berth in the 2009 Memorial Cup. In Game 7 for the QMJHL championship, Hoffman scored a goal and an assist in Drummondville's 3–2 win over the Shawinigan Cataractes, finishing with 21 goals in 19 games in the playoffs. He was then selected by the Senators 130th overall in the 2009 NHL Entry Draft at the age of 19. The Senators could have signed him after the Draft as a free agent had he gone unselected, but 14 other NHL teams had shown interest in drafting him, necessitating Ottawa's selection. Hoffman subsequently attended the Senators' development and training camps and played in a pre-season game against the Montreal Canadiens, but was designated for assignment and returned to the QMJHL.

Hoffman played the 2009–10 season, his "over-age" season, for the Saint John Sea Dogs, who traded a second-round draft choice to Drummondville for the player. Hoffman recorded 85 points (46 goals, 39 assists) in 56 games. His goal scoring broke the all-time goal single-season scoring record for the Sea Dogs, surpassing Scott Howes' goal total. His point total also placed him third in the QMJHL in goals, tied for second in power-play goals (17) and seventh in overall scoring. Hoffman was also named a First Team QMJHL All-Star, won the League Most Valuable Player trophy, the League Sportsman of the Year trophy and was a finalist for the Canadian Hockey League (CHL) Player of the Year award.

Professional

Ottawa Senators

In July 2010, Hoffman attended the Ottawa Senators' development camp, and on July 22, 2010, he signed an entry-level contract with the NHL club. After attending rookie camp and training camp with Ottawa, Hoffman was assigned to the Binghamton Senators, the Senators' American Hockey League (AHL) affiliate. Hoffman played the majority of the season with Binghamton and was a member of the 2011 Calder Cup-winning team. He also spent time in the ECHL with the Elmira Jackals during the season, Ottawa's second-tier affiliate.

Hoffman returned to Binghamton for the 2011–12 season. He was called up to Ottawa in December 2011 and made his NHL debut on December 23, 2011, against the Carolina Hurricanes; he was held pointless in his debut.

Hoffman was the leading scorer for Binghamton during the 2012–13 season prior to suffering a broken collarbone just before the AHL All-Star Game. He played three games with Ottawa before re-injuring the collarbone and missing the last 12 regular season and first 10 playoff games.

Hoffman began the 2013–14 season in Binghamton. He was recalled to Ottawa on December 2, 2013, after recording 26 points in 21 games, the second-highest point total in the AHL at the time. He was returned to Binghamton, but returned to Ottawa in February 2014 and remained with the team for the final 23 games. In 2014–15, Hoffman played the whole season in Ottawa and his 27 goals led the team. He was selected to play in the NHL All-Star weekend and led all NHL rookies in goals.

Following the 2014–15 NHL season Hoffman became a restricted free agent under the NHL Collective Bargaining Agreement. The Ottawa Senators made him a qualifying offer to retain his NHL rights and, on July 5, 2015, Hoffman filed for salary arbitration. According to media reports, Hoffman asked for $3.4 million, while the Senators countered with $1.7 million. Hoffman was awarded a one-year $2 million deal, which the Senators accepted. Hoffman became a restricted free agent at the end of the 2015–16 season. On July 27, 2016, he re-signed with the Senators to a four-year, $20.75M deal, thereby avoiding arbitration.

Fiancée harassment controversy
On May 4, 2018, teammate Erik Karlsson's wife, Melinda, filed an order of protection against Hoffman's fiancée, Monika Caryk. The order came in response to a large number of harassing messages directed toward the Karlssons over an extended period of time, allegedly originating from Caryk. The alleged harassment included utilizing multiple fake social media accounts to direct over 1,000 "negative and derogatory" comments towards the Karlssons, including comments wishing that someone would injure Erik Karlsson’s legs to end his career, and others wishing Karlsson's wife and her then-unborn child dead. The Karlssons' son was later stillborn.

During a 2018 court deposition, Caryk burst into tears and threatened to leave the room during questioning. She told the court that she and Melinda Karlsson began as friends and that the Karlssons were never outwardly hostile towards her. When asked how the friendship deteriorated, Caryk stated that she became offended after her Facebook and Instagram posts stopped receiving "likes" from Melinda Karlsson, and Caryk became more upset when she stopped receiving invitations to team dinners organized for wives and girlfriends of Senators' players. The deposition revealed that wives and girlfriends of several players associated with the Senators and other organizations had contacted Caryk privately before the matter had ever gone public, admonishing her for her continued and increasing hostility towards the Karlssons.

Although the allegations against Caryk remain unproven in a court of law, Hoffman was swiftly traded from Ottawa once the harassment allegations were made public. Senators' goaltender Craig Anderson later hinted that the situation was a factor in his own poor performance and request to be traded after signing a contract extension the season prior. He noted that he felt the situation had been resolved with Hoffman's exit from the team.

Florida Panthers
On June 19, 2018, the Senators traded Hoffman, along with Cody Donaghey and a fifth-round pick of the 2020 NHL Entry Draft to the San Jose Sharks in exchange for Mikkel Boedker, Julius Bergman, and a sixth-round pick in the 2020 Draft. About two hours later, he was traded to the Florida Panthers together with a seventh-round pick of the 2018 NHL Entry Draft for a fourth-round and fifth-round pick of the 2018 NHL Entry Draft and a second-round pick of the 2019 Draft.

On October 13, 2018, Hoffman embarked on a 17–game point streak with the Panthers, scoring 10 goals and 10 assists, breaking the franchise record previously held by Pavel Bure with 13 games in 1999–00.

St. Louis Blues
On December 27, 2020, Hoffman signed a professional tryout agreement with the St. Louis Blues. On January 11, 2021, Hoffman and the Blues officially agreed on a one-year, $4 million contract. In the shortened  season, Hoffman tallied 36 points in 52 games. In a top-six scoring role he recorded seven of his goals on the power play, leading the Blues. Hoffman added one goal in 4 playoff contests against the Colorado Avalanche.

Montreal Canadiens
On July 28, 2021, Hoffman was signed a three-year, $13.5 million contract with the Montreal Canadiens as an unrestricted free agent. On reporting to training camp, it was found that Hoffman had a knee injury that would cause him to miss up to four weeks. As a result he did not play in any of the team's pre-season games.

Career statistics

Awards and honours

References

External links

1989 births
Binghamton Senators players
Canadian ice hockey left wingers
Drummondville Voltigeurs players
Elmira Jackals (ECHL) players
Florida Panthers players
Gatineau Olympiques players
Ice hockey people from Ontario
Kitchener Rangers players
Living people
Montreal Canadiens players
Ottawa Senators draft picks
Ottawa Senators players
Saint John Sea Dogs players
St. Louis Blues players
Sportspeople from Kitchener, Ontario
20th-century Canadian people
21st-century Canadian people